Mount King Albert is located on the border of Alberta and British Columbia on the Continental Divide  at the North end of Height of the Rockies Provincial Park. It was named in 1918 after King Albert.

See also
 List of peaks on the British Columbia–Alberta border

References

Two-thousanders of Alberta
Two-thousanders of British Columbia
Canadian Rockies